Carl Johan Georg Pehrson (born 8 May 1968) is a Swedish politician who has been leader of the  Liberal Party since 8 April 2022. He has been a Member of Parliament since 2018, representing Örebro County, and previously represented the same constituency from 1998 to 2015. He is Minister for Employment and Minister for Integration since October 2022.

Biography

Early life and career
Pehrson was born in Längbro in Örebro County. He has a Bachelor of Laws degree from Uppsala University. He became a member of the Liberal People's Party in 1985 with a previous background from the Liberal Youth of Sweden. Before being elected to the parliament in 1998, Pehrson worked as a court clerk at the Örebro district court. From 2001 to 2002 Pehrson was Party Secretary of the Liberal People's Party.

Leader of the Liberals Party (2022–present) 
On 8 April 2022, Nyamko Sabuni resigned as party leader. On the same day, the Liberals announced that Pehrson, as the first deputy chairman, would take over as acting party leader. He will lead the Liberals over the 2022 Swedish general election. At an extra national meeting in December, an ordinary new party leader is elected.

Personal life

Pehrson lives in Örebro with his wife and four children.

References

External links

Johan Pehrson at the Liberal People's Party
Johan Pehrson at the Riksdag

1968 births
21st-century Swedish politicians
Articles containing video clips
Living people
Members of the Riksdag from the Liberals (Sweden)
Members of the Riksdag 1998–2002
Members of the Riksdag 2002–2006
Members of the Riksdag 2006–2010
Members of the Riksdag 2010–2014
Members of the Riksdag 2014–2018
Members of the Riksdag 2018–2022
Members of the Riksdag 2022–2026
Uppsala University alumni